Floccularia is a genus of fungi in the order Agaricales. There are four recognized species in the genus, which have a widespread distribution, especially in northern temperate regions. Two former species are now classified as a Cercopemyces and an Amanita (or more specifically an Aspidella, Amanitaceae). Floccularia was circumscribed by Czech mycologist Zdeněk Pouzar in 1957.

Floccularia albolanaripes and F. luteovirens are known to be edible.

See also
List of Agaricaceae genera
List of Agaricales genera

References

Agaricaceae
Agaricales genera